Ezzatabad-e Sharm Dasht (also Romanized as ʿEzzatābād-e Sharm Dasht; also known as Sharm Dasht) is a village in Eshkevar-e Sofla Rural District, Rahimabad District, Rudsar County, Gilan Province, Iran. At the 2006 census, its population was 197, in 48 families.

References 

Populated places in Rudsar County